Sakhi  is a village development committee in Rolpa District in the Rapti Zone of north-eastern Nepal. At the time of the 1991 Nepal census it had a population of 2798 people living in 525 individual households.

To Promote local culture Sakhi has one FM radio station Radio Sunchhahari F.M - 101.5 MHz Which is a Community radio Station.

References

Populated places in Rolpa District